Rembele Airport  is an airport serving the city of Takengon in the Central Aceh Regency, Aceh, Sumatra Island, Indonesia. The airport serves as one of the point of entry to the Gayo highland, a tourism destination where it is known for its coffee and natural environment, such as Lake Laut Tawar. To boost tourism growth in the region, the airport was renovated between 2014 and 2016. The airport's terminal which originally only had an area of 400 m2 was expanded to 1000 m2.

The terminal can accommodate around 200,000 passengers annually. The appearance of the interior of the terminal was extensively remodeled. On the air side, the runway was extended from the original  1,400 m x 30 m to 2,250 m x 30 m so that it can accommodate narrow-body aircraft such as the Boeing 737 Next Generation and the C-130 Hercules. The apron was enlarged from the original 80 m x 106 m to 95 m x 150 m. The runway and taxiway were also paved. The airport's renovation was finished in 2016 and it was inaugurated by President Joko Widodo on 2 March 2016.

Former Minister of Transportation Ignasius Jonan stated that since Rembele Airport is located in a mountainous area, it would serve as an mitigation airport in the event of a disaster, particularly a tsunami, such as the one that devastated Aceh in 2004.

Facilities
It has one runway designated 09/27 with an asphalt surface measuring 2,250 m x 30 m (7,382 ft × 98,425 ft).

Airlines and destinations

The following destinations are served from Takengon Rembele Airport:

References

Airports in Aceh
Transport in Sumatra